The National League was the main speedway league in the United Kingdom from 1932 until 1964, after which it merged with the Provincial League to form the British League. Prior to 1932 there were only small regional leagues competing within the sport in the UK, with the Northern League and the Southern League merging for the inaugural 1932 season.

History
Initially a single division, in 1936 a second division was created, initially named the Provincial League, but becoming National League Division Two in 1938. When league racing resumed after World War II, there was initially a single division. Six clubs started a new grass roots Northern League that year, and with more tracks opening up, the National League expanded to three divisions in 1947. For several reasons, including the levels of Entertainment tax and competition for audiences from television, a number of teams ceased to be profitable and the league reverted to two divisions in 1954. Further withdrawals led to a reduction to a single eleven-team division in 1957.

Continuing reduction in spectator numbers, and dissatisfaction with the way speedway was structured and managed led several promoters (including Mike Parker, Reg Fearman, and Johnnie Hoskins) to create the breakaway Provincial League in 1960. Working within tighter budgets, they were nevertheless more successful commercially than the National League promotions. After relations between the two leagues broke down in 1963, an RAC commission led to the two leagues merging in 1965 to form the British League.

The National League name was revived in 1975 when the British League Division Two was renamed, initially to the New National League. The name was reused again for the third tier of British speedway from 2009.

Champions

See also
 List of United Kingdom Speedway League Champions

References

Speedway leagues
Speedway competitions in the United Kingdom
Sports leagues established in 1932
1964 disestablishments